The 2002 Broadland District Council election took place on 2 May 2002 to elect members of Broadland District Council in England. This was on the same day as other local elections.

Election result

References

2002 English local elections
May 2002 events in the United Kingdom
2002
2000s in Norfolk